I Am Vengeance: Retaliation is a 2020 British action film written and directed by Ross Boyask and starring Wade Barrett (reprising his role as John Gold) and Vinnie Jones.  It is the sequel to the 2018 film I Am Vengeance.

Cast
Wade Barrett (credited as Stu Bennett) as John Gold
Vinnie Jones as Sean Teague
Mark Griffin as Frost
Katrina Durden as Jen Quaid
Phoebe Robinson-Galvin as Kate Lynch
Sam Benjamin as Shapiro 
David Schaal as Commander Grayson
Jessica-Jane Stafford as Pearl
Bentley Kalu as Renner
Jean Paul Ly as Kelso

Release
The film was released to digital on demand and digital platforms on 19 June 2020 in the United States and on 13 July 2020 in the United Kingdom. It was later released to DVD and Blu-Ray in the United States on 11 August 2020.

Reception
Tom Cassidy of Common Sense Media awarded the film three stars out of five.

References

External links
 
 

British action films
British sequel films
2020 films
2020 action films
Saban Films films
2020s English-language films
2020s British films